Stevan Ostojić (Serbian Cyrillic: Стеван Остојић; 20 August 1941 – 15 May 2022) was a Serbian professional footballer who played as a striker.

Born just a few months following the start of World War II in Yugoslavia to father Spasoje who worked as a railroad engineer, young Ostojić grew up in Subotica where the family moved during the war. He began playing football during the mid-1950s when his older brother Ivan who already played with OFK Subotica took him to a training session.

Honours
Red Star Belgrade
 Yugoslav First League: 1967–68, 1968–69
 Yugoslav Cup: 1967–68, 1970–71
 Mitropa Cup: 1967–68

References

External links
 NASL stats
 
 
 

1941 births
2022 deaths
People from North Banat District
Yugoslav footballers
Serbian footballers
Association football forwards
Yugoslavia international footballers
Yugoslav First League players
Ligue 2 players
Süper Lig players
North American Soccer League (1968–1984) players
FK Radnički Niš players
Red Star Belgrade footballers
AS Monaco FC players
Fenerbahçe S.K. footballers
San Jose Earthquakes (1974–1988) players
Yugoslav football managers
Serbian football managers
Red Star Belgrade non-playing staff
Red Star Belgrade managers
Yugoslav expatriate footballers
Yugoslav expatriate sportspeople in Monaco
Expatriate footballers in Monaco
Yugoslav expatriate sportspeople in Turkey
Expatriate footballers in Turkey
Yugoslav expatriate sportspeople in the United States
Expatriate soccer players in the United States